Charles Paulet, 1st Duke of Bolton  (c. 1630 – 27 February 1699), was an English nobleman, the son of John Paulet, 5th Marquess of Winchester, and his first wife, Jane Savage.

Career
Paulet succeeded his father as the sixth Marquess of Winchester in 1675. He was MP for Winchester in 1660 and then for Hampshire from 1661 to 5 March 1675. Before his succession to the Marquessate he was styled Lord St John.

He held the following offices:
 Freeman, Winchester June 1660, Hartlepool 1670
 Justice of the Peace Hampshire July 1660-?d., Yorkshire (North Riding) 1664-?85, Surrey, Middlesex and Westminster 1671-?80, (East Riding) by 1680-85
 Commissioner for assessment, Hampshire August 1660–75, N. Riding 1663–75, West and East Ridings and County Durham 1673-5
 Commissioner for loyal and indigent officers, Hampshire 1662
 Lord Lieutenant Hampshire 1667–76, 1689-1699;
 Warden of the New Forest 1668–76, 1689-1699 
 High Steward, Winchester 1669-84 
 Custos rotulorum Hampshire 1670–6, 1689-1699 
 Keeper of King's Lodge, Petersham 1671-?76 
 Commissioner for recusants, Hampshire 1675 
 Colonel of militia horse and foot by 1697-1699
 Privy Councillor 22 April 1679 – 1699
 Colonel of foot 1689-98

Having supported the claim of William and Mary to the English throne in 1688, he was restored to the Privy Council and to the office of Lord Lieutenant of Hampshire, and was created Duke of Bolton on 9 April 1689. He built Bolton Hall, North Yorkshire in 1678.

Character 

An eccentric man, hostile to Lord Halifax and afterwards to the Duke of Marlborough, he is said to have travelled during 1687 with four coaches and 100 horsemen, sleeping during the day and giving entertainments at night. His adherence in adult life to the Church of England has been described as a great blow to the Roman Catholic community: his father (with whom his relationship was never good) had openly professed the Catholic faith, and used his wealth and influence to protect the Catholics of Hampshire.

In 1666 he briefly went into hiding after becoming involved in a public fracas in Westminster Hall with Sir Andrew Henley, 1st Baronet. They fought in full view of the Court of Common Pleas, and were thus guilty of contempt coram rege. Both men in time received a royal pardon. Paulet, who admitted to striking the first blow, explained that he had been "in a passion" at the time. The precise cause of the quarrel is unknown. Samuel Pepys, who recorded the incident in the great Diary, remarked that it was a pity that Henley retaliated, for otherwise, the judges might have dealt with Paulet, of whom Pepys had a poor opinion, as he deserved. Despite his faults, his charm and affability made him numerous friends.

Marriage and issue
Charles Paulet married twice:

First marriage
He married as his first wife, 28 February 1652, Christian (13 December 1633 – 22 May 1653), daughter of John Frescheville, 1st Baron Frescheville of Staveley, Derbyshire and Sarah Harrington, and by her had a son:
 Unknown Paulet, born May 1653, died May 1653
Christian, Lady St. John, died on 22 May 1653 in childbirth and was buried with her infant at Staveley, Derbyshire.

Second marriage
He married as his second wife, 12 February 1655, at St. Dionis Backchurch, London, Mary (died 1 November 1680), the illegitimate daughter of Emanuel Scrope, 1st Earl of Sunderland, widow of Henry Carey, Lord Leppington, and by her had issue:
 Jane Paulet, c.1656–23 May 1716, married 2 April 1673 John Egerton, 3rd Earl of Bridgwater
 Mary Paulet
 Charles Paulet, 2nd Duke of Bolton, 1661–1722
 William Paulet, c.1663/7–

Mary, Lady Paulet died 1 Nov 1680, at Moulins, Allier, France, and was buried, 12 Nov 1680, at Wensley, Yorkshire.

Death 
Charles Paulet died suddenly at Amport on 27 February 1699, aged 68, and was buried on 23 March at Basing, Hampshire.

Footnotes

Sources

External links
 POWLETT, (PAULET), Charles I, Lord St. John of Basing (c.1630-99), of Lincoln's Inn Fields, London and Hackwood, Hants. A Biography
 Bolton Hall, Preston-under-Scar

|-

|-

1625 births
1699 deaths
People from Richmondshire (district)
People from Basingstoke and Deane
Lord-Lieutenants of Hampshire
Members of the Privy Council of England
Charles
11
English MPs 1660
English MPs 1661–1679
Burials at St. Mary's Church, Old Basing